Round Top Island is an island located close to the south-western coast of Tasmania, Australia. The  island is part of the Maatsuyker Islands Group, and comprises part of the Southwest National Park and the Tasmanian Wilderness World Heritage Site.

Fauna
The island is part of the Maatsuyker Island Group Important Bird Area, identified as such by BirdLife International because of its importance as a breeding site for seabirds. Recorded breeding seabird species are the short-tailed shearwater (8900 pairs), fairy prion (9300 pairs), common diving-petrel (8700 pairs), Pacific gull and silver gull.  The metallic skink and Tasmanian tree skink are present.

See also

 South East Cape
 South West Cape
 List of islands of Tasmania

References

Islands of South West Tasmania
Protected areas of Tasmania
Important Bird Areas of Tasmania